Monterrey is a small town in Huaraz District, Huaraz Province, region of Ancash, Peru. Monterrey is located in the Santa river valley, also known as Callejon de Huaylas at 2981 m.a.s.l.

Hot springs 
Water at the hot springs, which are privately run by a local hotel, is brownish due to the presence of iron.

Climate 
The climate at Monterrey is temperate, with warm days and cold nights, being  the average temperature.

References 

Ancash Region
Tourist attractions in Ancash Region
Tourist attractions in Peru